Muhamed Mehmedbašić (1887 – 29 May 1943) was a Bosnian revolutionary and conspirator in the assassination of Archduke Franz Ferdinand.

Early life
Mehmedbašić was born in 1887 into a Bosniak family in Stolac, in the region of Herzegovina (at the time part of Austro-Hungarian  Bosnia and Herzegovina). His father was impoverished, formerly part of the Ottoman Bosnian nobility. Mehmedbašić worked as a carpenter. During a Muslim youth organization's trip to Belgrade, Mehmedbašić befriended Mustafa Golubić (another Muslim, also from Stolac) who influenced his revolutionary feelings. Mehmedbašić, as did Mustafa Golubić, identified as Serb Muslim.

While working as a carpenter, Mehmedbašić befriended Black Hand member Danilo Ilić, the main organizer of conspiracy against the Austro-Hungarian rule in Bosnia and Herzegovina. He joined the Young Bosnia revolutionary organization and became a colleague of its ideologue Vladimir Gaćinović, who was also a member of the Black Hand. As Mehmedbašić held strong Serbian nationalist sentiment, and Ilić and Gaćinović saw a strong character in him, he was given delicate duties. He was sworn into the Black Hand by Provincial Director for Bosnia-Herzegovina Vladimir Gaćinović and Danilo Ilić. In 1912–13, Serbia fought in the Balkan Wars. Black Hand founding member Vojislav Tankosić led a Chetnik detachment, in which many revolutionaries volunteered (including Golubić).

Young Bosnia

Potiorek assassination plot
In late 1913, Danilo Ilić recommended the end of revolutionary organization building and a move to direct action against Austria-Hungary when meeting a Serbian captain and fellow Black Hand member in Užice. Ilić then met with Chief of Serbian Military Intelligence Colonel Dragutin Dimitrijević "Apis", the leader of the Black Hand, to discuss the matter.  Apis' right hand, Serbian Major Vojislav Tankosić, called an action planning meeting in Toulouse, France. On Orthodox New Year, Golubić called Mehmedbašić, who was in Stolac, to immediately come to the meeting in Toulouse. During this January 1914 meeting, various possible Austro-Hungarian targets for assassination were discussed, including Franz Ferdinand. However, it was decided only to kill the Governor of Bosnia, Oskar Potiorek. The assassination plot was organized in Toulouse by Gaćinović and Golubić. Mehmedbašić was chosen for the task. He had left Stolac with 300 krone borrowed to finance the plot. Mehmedbašić was (according to himself) "eager to carry out an act of terrorism to revive the revolutionary spirit of Bosnia." He was given a Swedish knife containing poison.

Mehmedbašić arrived at Dubrovnik by steamship, and then traveled by train. At the Hum train station, on the way to Sarajevo, gendarmes searched the train; fearing they were on to him, he threw the knife out the window. Potiorek was planned to be assassinated at the end of March 1914, when the new mufti Čaušević was to be enthroned in Sarajevo. However, upon hearing that Archduke Franz Ferdinand of Austria would come to Sarajevo on Vidovdan, the Black Hand changed their minds. The Archduke's scheduled visit on Vidovdan (28 June), a Serbian national holiday, was perceived as an insult. Ilić summoned Mehmedbašić and informed him on 26 March that the plan now was to murder Archduke Franz Ferdinand, as ordered by Apis, and Mehmedbašić should stand by for the new operation. Mehmedbašić said during talks of the assassination that "half of Bosnia and Herzegovina will join the plot, and the other half will approve everything we do".

Assassination of Archduke Franz Ferdinand
 
Apis and fellow conspirators Milan Ciganović and Major Tankosić hired three youngsters, Gavrilo Princip, Nedeljko Čabrinović and Trifko Grabež to carry out the assassination. Gavrilo Princip stayed in Sarajevo with Danilo Ilić, who hired three more as a backup team, Vaso Čubrilović, Cvjetko Popović and Mehmedbašić. On 28 June, a Sunday, a motorcade took the royal party to the City Hall for the official reception. Security was light; the Archduke objected to heavy security and soldiers between him and the people. 120 police officers were on crowd duty. The group of six assassins were positioned along the route, the Appel Quay. The first opportunity came to Mehmedbašić, who stood by the Austro-Hungarian Bank, but he lost his nerve (later claiming that a policeman stood near and would have intervened if he took his grenade) and watched the motorcade pass. Likewise, the second, Čubrilović, did not act. The next, Čabrinović, threw his bomb which bounced off the royal car and exploded under the following car, wounding two in the car and twenty in the crowd, then failed at suicide as his cyanide did not work and was arrested. Princip, hearing the explosion, believed the assassination to be a success and went to a nearby café. The motorcade made it safely to the Hall, and speeches were held, in which Franz Ferdinand was concerned about the injured and insisted on visiting them at the hospital, advised against by von Morsey but supported by Potiorek.  As the motorcade took a wrong route to the hospital, it found itself outside the café where Princip was at; he fired fatal shots at the royal couple and then turned the gun at himself, however, two bystanders stopped him and he was arrested. 

Čabrinović and Princip gave up the names of their fellow conspirators under torture. Mehmedbašić managed to escape (wearing civilian clothes and a fez) to Montenegro, arriving on 4 July, but Danilo Ilić, Veljko Čubrilović, Vaso Čubrilović, Cvjetko Popović and Miško Jovanović were arrested and charged with treason and murder.  Upon learning that Mehmedbašić was in Nikšić, the Austro-Hungarian authorities urged the Montenegrin authorities to have him arrested and handed over to them. Jovan Plamenac said that the Montenegrin government gave strict orders to capture Mehmedbašić, but informed the Austro-Hungarian diplomacy that the Montenegrin government had no intention to hand him over if they captured him, and that instead, a Montenegrin court would judge him. On 12 July, Mehmedbašić was apprehended by the Montenegrin authorities. However, before he was extradited he escaped from the Nikšić prison two days later. It has been claimed that the Montenegrin government hid him and had him sent over the Čakor mountain into Serbia. The Austro-Hungarian authorities suspected Montenegrin collusion in his escape and arrested the gendarmes who guarded Mehmedbašić. During his captivity Mehmedbašić admitted his complicity in the assassination.

World War I

In Serbia, Mehmedbašić met up with Mustafa Golubić, with whom he joined the Chetnik detachment of Vojislav Tankosić that fought in World War I. He trained Bosnian volunteers. Mehmedbašić met with Apis on several occasions.

Mehmedbašić was accused of having participated in an alleged plot to kill Serbian regent Alexander in 1916. For some time, Regent Alexander and officers loyal to him had planned to get rid of the military clique headed by Apis who represented a political threat to Alexander's power. The Austro-Hungarian peace demand gave added impetus to this plan. On 15 March 1917 Apis and the officers loyal to him were indicted, on various false charges by Serbian Court Martial on the French-controlled Salonika front (known in Serbo-Croatian as ). On 23 May Apis and eight of his associates were sentenced to death; two others (one was Mehmedbašić) were sentenced to 15 years in prison. Charges were eventually reduced, leaving three death sentences in place. Among those tried, Apis, Ljubomir Vulović, Rade Malobabić and Mehmedbašić confessed their roles in Sarajevo.  During the trial, Mehmedbašić said that "I saw in Serbia with my eyes as the Piedmont of Serbdom, I couldn't see anything else..." and that his idol was "the national guslar (poet) singing Serbian songs". It was later found that Mehmedbašić had in fact proved the trial false. Serbia's Supreme Court retried the case and all defendants were exonerated (rehabilitated) in 1953.

He survived the war and arrival of the Serbian army in Bosnia and Herzegovina, the "happiest day in his life". Mehmedbašić was commuted and released in 1919.

Interwar period and death
After World War I, Mehmedbašić returned to Sarajevo and in 1919 was pardoned.

Mehmedbašić was killed during World War II by the Ustaše on 29 May 1943. He was buried in the Butmir district of Sarajevo, on the outskirts of the city.

References

Sources

 
 
 
 
 
 
 
 
 
 
 
 
 
 
 
 

1880s births
1943 deaths
20th-century Serbian people
Assassination of Archduke Franz Ferdinand of Austria
Austro-Hungarian rebels
Black Hand (Serbia)
Bosnia and Herzegovina civilians killed in World War II
Bosnia and Herzegovina Muslims
Bosnia and Herzegovina people of World War I
Bosniaks of Bosnia and Herzegovina
People executed by the Independent State of Croatia
People from Stolac
People from the Condominium of Bosnia and Herzegovina
Recipients of Serbian royal pardons
Serbian people of World War I
Serbs of Bosnia and Herzegovina
Young Bosnia